Parliamentary elections were held in Iran on 13 March 1980, with a second round on 9 May. They were the first elections to the Majlis since the overthrow of the Shah, and were contested to a considerable degree on a party basis.

It resulted in a victory for the Islamic Republican Party, which won 85 of the 270 seats, whilst its allies won a further 45. The party, joined by smaller Islamist groups in the Grand coalition was a highly organized force and put up candidates in most constituencies and dominated the campaigns, especially in the provinces.

President Abolhassan Banisadr and his followers, presented dozens of candidates in Tehran and provinces under the list Office for the Cooperation of the People with the President.

The Freedom Movement of Iran which failed to organize effectively, fielded at most only 40 candidates under the banner of Eponym Group and won about 20 seats.

Among National Front candidates, four won the election but their credentials was rejected on the grounds such as being "landlord" or "American agent" and they were not allowed to take their seat. Its leader Karim Sanjabi withdrew in the run-off because of the alleged "irregularities".

Under the name Progressive Revolutionary Candidates list, People's Mujahedin of Iran endorsed 127 nominees nationwide and the official counts gave them as much as 20% of the votes in some constituencies, however they failed to win any seats. Its leader Massoud Rajavi received 531,943 votes in Tehran but was defeated in the run-offs.

Tudeh Party lacked popularity and did poorly, with their highest ranked candidate in Tehran receiving only some 100,000 votes. The party was unable to persuade other left-wing groups to unite.

Electoral system
The constitution approved in a December 1979 referendum provided for a 270-seat Majlis, with five seats reserved for minority groups including Jews, Zoroastrians, Armenians from the north and south of the country and one jointly elected by Assyrians and Chaldeans.

As there was no electoral law at the time of the elections, they were held in accordance with a proposal from the Ministry of the Interior and approved by the Council of the Revolution. However, the elections were postponed in 23 constituencies in Kurdistan Province and Sistan and Balochistan Province.

Results

137 of the elected MPs were clerics. 
Ettela'at newspaper (1980)

Thapar (1980)

Abrahamian (1989)

Nohlen et al (2001)

References

1980 elections in Iran
Aftermath of the Iranian Revolution
Islamic Consultative Assembly elections
Iran